William K. Howard (June 16, 1899 – February 21, 1954) was an American film director, writer, and producer. Considered one of Hollywood's leading directors, he directed over 50 films from 1921 to 1946, including The Thundering Herd (1925), The Power and the Glory (1933), Fire Over England (1937), and Johnny Come Lately (1943).

Biography
William K. Howard was born on June 16, 1899, in St. Marys, Ohio. After serving in Europe during World War I, he graduated from Ohio State University with a degree in engineering law.
 
In 1920, Howard began working in Hollywood as an assistant director on The Adorable Savage. The following year, at the age of twenty-two, he directed his first film, Get Your Man. That same year he directed two additional films—Play Square and What Love Will Do—and write The One-Man Trail. Throughout the 1920s and 1930s, Howard completing two or three films each year. In the 1920s his directorial work included The Border Legion (1924), The Thundering Herd (1925), White Gold (1927), The Valiant (1929), and Christina (1929). In the 1930s he directed such films as Sherlock Holmes (1932), Rendezvous (1935), Fire Over England (1937), and Back Door to Heaven (1939).

Howard's 1933 film The Power and the Glory with Spencer Tracy was overlooked for decades, but in recent years it has received significant reappraisal due to recognition that the film was a major influence on the structure of Citizen Kane.

Howard began directing 1940's Knute Rockne, All American, but after a disagreement with the studio was replaced by Lloyd Bacon. The film includes the scene in which future President of the United States Ronald Reagan, portraying terminally ill football player George Gipp, asks Rockne to have the team "win just one for the Gipper".

Howard married his wife, Margaret Howard, in Las Vegas in 1949. After suffering from a throat malignancy, which started in 1953, he died in Los Angeles on February 21, 1954, at the age of 54.

On February 8, 1960, he was awarded the posthumous honor of a star on the Hollywood Walk of Fame, at 1500 Vine Street.

Filmography

 Play Square (1921)
 Get Your Man (1921)
 What Love Will Do (1921)
 Deserted at the Altar (1922)
 Lucky Dan (1922)
 Captain Fly-by-Night (1922)
 Extra! Extra! (1922)
 Trooper O'Neill (1922)
 Let's Go (1923)
 The Fourth Musketeer (1923)
 Danger Ahead (1923)
 East of Broadway (1924)
 The Border Legion (1924)
 The Thundering Herd (1925)
 Code of the West (1925)
 The Light of Western Stars (1925)
 Red Dice (1926)
 Volcano! (1926)
 Gigolo (1926)
 Bachelor Brides (1926)
 White Gold (1927)
 The Main Event (1927)
 A Ship Comes In (1928)
 The River Pirate (1928)
 Sin Town (1929)
 Love, Live and Laugh (1929)
 The Valiant (1929)
 Christina (1929)
 Good Intentions (1930)
 Scotland Yard (1930)
 Transatlantic (1931)
 Surrender (1931)
 Don't Bet on Women (1931)
 The First Year (1932)
 Sherlock Holmes (1932)
 The Trial of Vivienne Ware (1932)
 The Power and the Glory (1933)
 The Cat and the Fiddle (1934)
 Evelyn Prentice (1934)
 This Side of Heaven (1934)
 Rendezvous (1935)
 Mary Burns, Fugitive (1935)
 The Princess Comes Across (1936)
 Fire Over England (1937)
 The Squeaker (1937)
 Over the Moon (1939)
 Back Door to Heaven (1939)
 Money and the Woman (1940)
 Knute Rockne, All American (1940)
 'Til We Meet Again (1940)
 Bullets for O'Hara (1941)
 Klondike Fury (1942)
 Johnny Come Lately (1943)
 When the Lights Go On Again (1944)
 A Guy Could Change (1946)

References

External links
 

1899 births
1954 deaths
Screenwriters from Ohio
American military personnel of World War I
American male screenwriters
Burials at Forest Lawn Memorial Park (Glendale)
People from St. Mary's, Ohio
Film directors from Ohio
Film producers from Ohio
20th-century American male writers
20th-century American screenwriters